Nargis is a commune in the Loiret department in north-central France. It is situated along the Loing river, a tributary of the Seine river.

See also
Communes of the Loiret department

References

Communes of Loiret